The 2022 CONCACAF League Final was the final round of the 2022 CONCACAF League, the sixth and final edition  of the CONCACAF League, the secondary club football tournament organised by CONCACAF, the regional governing body of North America, Central America, and the Caribbean.

The final was currently being contested in two-legged home-and-away format between Olimpia from Honduras and Alajuelense from Costa Rica. 

The first leg was hosted by Olimpia at the Estadio Nacional Chelato Uclés in Tegucigalpa on 26 October 2022, and the second leg was hosted by Alajuelense at the Estadio Alejandro Morera Soto in Alajuela on 2 November 2022.

Teams

Venues

Road to the final

Note: In all results below, the score of the finalist is given first (H: home; A: away).

Format
The final was on a home-and-away two-legged basis, with the team with the better performance in previous rounds (excluding preliminary round) hosting the second leg.

The away goals rule was not be applied, and extra time would be played if the aggregate score was tied after the second leg. If the aggregate score was still tied after extra time, the penalty shoot-out would be used to determine the winner (Regulations II, Article G).

Performance ranking

Matches

First leg

Second leg

External links

References

Final
2022
2022–23 in Honduran football
International association football competitions hosted by Honduras
C.D. Olimpia matches
2022–23 in Costa Rican football
International association football competitions hosted by Costa Rica
October 2022 sports events in North America
November 2022 sports events in North America
Liga Deportiva Alajuelense matches